This is a timeline of the 1967–present Naxalite–Maoist insurgency in eastern India.

1960s:1977 
 The communists in 1965:66 already had gained grounds in the Naxalbari region. The so:called "siliguri group" launched the uprising by giving the call for initiation of armed struggle. Many peasant cells were created throughout the region.
 On 3 March 1967, some peasants seized a plot of land in the region and started harvesting crops. By 18 March the peasants started seizing land from jotedars (ladlords landowners who owned large plots of land in the region were called jotedars).
 The inspector of Jharugaon village was killed by peasant committee members. In retaliation the police opened fire killing nine women and one child on 25 May 1967.
 The Communist Party of India (Marxist:Leninist) was formed by the All India Coordination Committee of Communist Revolutionaries (AICCCR) at a congress in Calcutta in 1969. The foundation of the party was declared by Kanu Sanyal at a mass meeting in Calcutta on 22 April (Lenin's birthday).
 In 1975, Prime Minister Indira Gandhi declared Emergency due to internal trouble. Indira government fell after a huge loss in 1977 election.

1977:1990s 
 On 22 April 1980, the Communist Party of India (Marxist:Leninist) People's War, commonly called the People's War Group (PWG) was founded by Kondapalli Seetharamaiah.
On 12 February 1992, 37 or 38 people belonging to the Bhumihar community were killed in Bara village, Gaya district, Bihar.
On 1 December 1997 believing that the village's Dalits, mostly poor and landless, were sympathizers to the Maoists behind the Bara village massacre, the upper caste Ranvir Sena entered Laxmanpur Bathe village in Arwal district in Bihar and massacred 58 Dalits.
On 18 March 1999, 34 people belonging to the Bhumihar community were killed in Senari village, Jehanabad district, Bihar.

2000s

2002 
The People's War Group (PWG) intensified its attacks against politicians, police officers, and land and business owners in response to a July ban imposed on the group by the Andhra Pradesh government. The government responded by tightening security, allegedly ordering attacks on suspected PWG members by state police and the "Green Tigers". Police forces continued to have virtual impunity for the killing of PWG rebels during police encounters. The Maoist Communist Center rebels intensified their armed campaign against Indian security forces following the killing of their leader by police in December. An estimated 140 people were killed in fighting between the PWG and government forces throughout the year. According to government reports, 482 people have died during the conflict in 2002.

2004 
Sporadic, low:intensity fighting between the PWG and government forces continued for most of the year. Attacks on police and Telugu Desam Party officials, believed to be carried out by the PWG, accounted for most major incidents and deaths. A three:month cease:fire, announced in late June, led to failed negotiations between the government and the PWG. A few days into the cease:fire, an attack attributed to the PWG placed the cease:fire in jeopardy. More than 500 people were killed in sporadic, low:intensity fighting, a reduction from previous years. Most victims were members of the police forces or the Telugu Desam Party (a regional political party).

 The Communist Party of India (Maoist) was founded on 21 September 2004, through the merger of the Communist Party of India (Marxist:Leninist) People's War (People's War Group), and the Maoist Communist Centre of India (MCCI).

2005 
Violent clashes between Maoist rebels and state security forces and paramilitary groups increased following the breakdown of peace talks between the PWG and the state government of Andhra Pradesh. Rebels continued to employ a wide range of low:intensity guerrilla tactics against government institutions, officials, security forces and paramilitary groups. For the first time in recent years, Maoist rebels launched two large scale attacks against urban government targets. Fighting was reported in 12 states covering most of south, central and north India with the exception of India's northeast and northwest. More than 700 people were reported killed this year in violent clashes. Over one:third of those killed were civilians.

In January 2005, talks between the Andhra Pradesh state government and the CPI:Maoists broke down and the rebels accused authorities of not addressing their demands for a written truce, release of prisoners and redistribution of land. The ongoing conflict had taken place over a vast territory (around half of India's 28 states) with hundreds of people being killed annually in clashes between the CPI:Maoists and the government every year since 2005.
In February 2005 the CPI (Maoist) killed 7 policemen, a civilian and injured many more during a mass attack on a school building in Venkatammanahalli village, Pavgada, Tumkur, Karnataka. On 17 August 2005, the government of Andhra Pradesh outlawed the Communist Party of India (Maoist) and various mass organisations close to it, and began to arrest suspected members and sympathizers days afterwards. The arrested included former emissaries at the peace talks of 2004.
On 13 November 2005 CPI (Maoist) fighters stunned authorities by attacking Jehanabad in Bihar, freeing 250 captured comrades and taking twenty imprisoned paramilitaries and executed their leader. They also detonated several bombs in the town. A prison guard was also reported killed.

2006 
Maoist attacks continued, primarily on government and police targets. Civilians were also impacted by landmine attacks affecting railway cars and truck convoys. Clashes between state police and rebels also resulted in deaths of members of both parties, and civilians that were caught in the firing. Fighting differs from state to state, depending on security and police force responses. In the state of Andhra Pradesh, security forces have been somewhat successful in maintaining control and combating Maoist rebels. The other state that is most affected, Chhattisgarh, has seen an increase in violence between Maoist rebels and villagers who are supported by the government. In 2006, 500 to 750 people were estimated killed, fewer than half Naxalites, and approximately one:third civilians.

 There were more than 40,000 displaced people in 2006.
On 28 February 2006 the Maoists attacked several anti:Maoist protesters in Erraboru village in Chhattisgarh using landmines, killing 25 people.
On 24 March 2006 over 500 heavily armed rebels attacked police camps in Orissa's Udayagiri town of Gajapati district, freeing 40 prisoners from the sub:jail.
On 16 July 2006 the Maoists attacked a relief camp in the Dantewada district where several villagers were kidnapped. The death toll was 29.
On 18 October 2006 women belonging to the Maoist guerrilla forces blasted four government buildings in the Bastar region of Chhattisgarh. On the day before, over a dozen armed cadres of the group, with support from male colleagues, blocked traffic on the Antagarh:Koylibera Road in the Kanker district, near the city of Raipur. They also detonated explosives inside four buildings, including two schools, in Kanker. This incident occurred two days after a major leader of the party's operations in Orissa and Andhra Pradesh, Kone Kedandam, surrendered to authorities in the town of Srikakulam.
On 2 December 2006 the BBC reported that at least 14 Indian policemen had been killed by Maoists in a landmine ambush near the town of Bokaro, 80 miles from Ranchi, the capital of the State of Jharkhand.
On 4 March 2007 Maoist shot dead a member of the parliament (Sunil Mahato) of the Jharkhand Mukti Morcha (JMM) party from Jharkhand state.

2007 
Fighting continued between Naxalite Maoists and government security forces throughout the year. The majority of hostilities took place in Chhattisgarh, which turned especially deadly when over 400 Naxalites attacked a Chhattisgarh police station, seizing arms and killing dozens.

 In November 2007, reports emerged that anti:SEZ (Special Economic Zone) movements such as the Bhoomi Uchched Pratirodh Committee in Nandigram in West Bengal, which arose after the land appropriation and human displacement following the SEZ Act of 2005, have joined forces with the Naxalites since February to keep the police out. Police found weapons belonging to Maoists near Nandigram. Civilians were forced to choose between joining the Maoist insurgence or supporting the Salwa Judum and face coercion from both sides. According to news reports, this conflict resulted in 650 deaths during 2007; of these 240 were civilians, 218 security personnel and 192 militants.
On 5 March 2007 Maoist shot dead a local Congress leader (Komati Prakash, a member of the local Mandal Praja Parishad (MPP)) in Andhra Pradesh while he was inspecting a road construction project in Mahabubnagar district. However, police reportedly believe that political rivals of Mahato, including organised criminal groups, may have been behind the assassination.
On 15 March 2007 an attack happened in the rebel stronghold area of Dantewada, in Chhattisgarh state. Fifty:four persons, including 15 personnel of the Chhattisgarh Armed Force, were killed in an offensive by 300 to 350 CPI (Maoist) cadres on a police base camp in the Bastar region in the early hours of Thursday. The remaining victims were tribal youths of Salwa Judum, designated as Special Police Officers (SPOs) and brought in to combat the Maoists. Eleven people were injured. The attack, which lasted nearly two:and:a:half hours, was spearheaded by the "State Military Commission (Maoist)", consisting of about 100 armed Naxalites.

2008 
Civilians were most impacted by the ongoing fighting between Maoist rebels and government security forces. Of the 16 states affected by this conflict, Chhattisgarh and Jharkhand were the most impacted. One positive note for Chhattisgarh was that fatalities, although still high, were significantly down from 2007. Similarly, Andhra Pradesh, the state with the most Maoist activity a few years ago, has improved security with a corresponding drop in fatality rates. Unfortunately, as conditions have improved in Chhattisgarh and Andhra Pradesh, the Maoist forces seem to have shifted their operations to the state of Orissa where conditions have worsened. South Asia Terrorism Portal's fatality count across the six states that saw the majority of the fighting (Bihar, Orissa, Jharkhand, Maharashtra, Chhattisgarh, and Andhra Pradesh) was 794.  This included 399 civilians, 221 security force personnel and 174 insurgents.

16 February: A group of 50 rebels armed with bombs and firearms, including women cadres, raided a police training school, police station and armoury in Orissa killing 12 police and leaving 4 wounded. Before launching the attack, the Naxals announced that they would not harm the public as their target was the police.
29 June: CPI(M) forces attacked a boat on the Balimela reservoir in Orissa carrying 4 anti:Naxalite police and 60 Greyhound commandos. The boat sunk, killing 38 troops, while 26 survived. The bodies of a total of 38 Greyhound commandos and police personnel were found after a two:week:long search. They are still looking for 40 missing weapons. The attack came just months after Andhra Pradesh Chief Minister YS Rajasekhara Reddy stated that the elite commando force, which is the highest paid in the entire country, should have their operations expanded throughout all affected regions and that "things are more or less under control. Every now and then, they (Maoists) indulge in high:profile attacks but that is just to show their token presence".
16 July: A landmine hit a police van in Malkangiri district, killing 21 policemen.
13 April: 10 paramilitary troops were killed in eastern Orissa when Maoists attacked a bauxite mine in the Koraput district.

2009 
In 2009, Naxalites were active across approximately 180 districts in ten states of India.  Around 1100 people died, including 600 civilians, 300 security personnel and 200 naxals.

 February: The Indian central government announced a new nationwide initiative to be called the Integrated Action Plan (IAP) for broad coordinated operations aimed at combatting and undermining support for the Naxalites in Karnataka, Chhattisgarh, Odisha, Andhra Pradesh, Maharashtra, Jharkhand, Bihar, Uttar Pradesh and West Bengal. This plan included funding for grass:roots economic development projects in Naxalite:affected areas as well as increased special police funding for better containment and reduction of Naxalite influence. After the first full year of implementation of the national IAP program, Karnataka was removed from the list of Naxal:affected states in August 2010. In July 2011, the number of Naxal:affected areas was reduced to 83 districts across nine states.
22 May: Naxalite guerrillas ambushed a police party, after luring it into the jungles of Gadchiroli district to investigate a roadblock, killing 16 policemen.
10 June: Nine policemen including paramilitary jawans and a CRPF officer were killed in a Naxalite attack while on routine patrol in what is considered to be a rebel:stronghold area deep in the Saranda jungle. Sudhir Kumar Jha, superintendent of police said: "As Naxalites are aware of the topography and knew that the convoy would have to return through the same spot, they had planted a powerful can:bomb and ambushed the police vehicle."
12 June: 29 Police Personnel including The Superintendent of Police of Rajnadgaon district, Shri Vinod Kumar Chaubey, was martyred which was occur in Rajnandgaon.
13 June: Naxalites launched two daylight attacks in and around a small town close to Bokaro, killing 10 policemen and injuring several others using landmines and bombs. Two Naxalite guerrillas were also injured.
16 June: 4 policemen were killed and 2 others seriously injured when Maoists ambushed them at Beherakhand in Palamau district. Reportedly the guerrillas were waiting inside the deep jungles and started firing indiscriminately as the policemen went past them, killing four of them on the spot.
16 June: At least 11 police officers were killed in a landmine attack followed by shooting between police and suspected Maoist rebels. 7 rebels were also killed in the gunfire.
23 June: During a 48-hour Bandh orchestrated by the Naxalites in protest against intensified paramilitary activity in Langargh a group of motorcycle borne armed Naxal rebels opened fire at the Lakhisarai district court premises in Bihar and freed four of their comrades. One of the four rescued was Ghaskar Marandi, who is the zonal commander of Ranchi. On the same day the Indian government banned the Communist Party of India (Maoist). Many including the Left Front oppose the ban arguing that "there is a requirement to bring all such outfits back into the mainstream politically."
12 July: At least 29 members of the Indian Police were killed in an ambush attack by Maoist rebels in Chhattisgarh. (see Rajnandgaon ambush)
19 September: In a fierce gun battle between the CoBRA, and CRPF, against the naxals, over 50 naxals were killed and around 200 captured. 20 soldiers were reported missing.
 September: India's Prime Minister Manmohan Singh admitted that the Maoists had growing appeal among a large section of Indian society, including tribal communities, the rural poor as well as sections of the intelligentsia and the youth. He added that "Dealing with left:wing extremism requires a nuanced strategy : a holistic approach. It cannot be treated simply as a law and order problem." In the first half of 2009, 56 Maoist attacks were reported. The South Asia Terrorism Portal reported 998 killed in the conflict: 392 civilians, 312 security forces and 294 rebels.
6 October: The body of a policeman, kidnapped a week before by Maoist rebels in Jharkhand, was found.
8 October: At least 17 members of the Indian Police, including a top commander, were killed in an ambush attack by Maoist rebels in Maharashtra. The fighting started after a group of Maoists attacked a police station in Gadchiroli district.
11 November: The Indias state launched a massive military offensive, codenamed Operation Green Hunt, deploying 50,000 soldiers. The operation is planned to last two years, with the objectives of rooting out insurgents and bringing stability to the regions. The Operation had been planned since 9 October 2009.

2010s

2010 

 During February 2010, the Silda camp attack killed 24 paramilitary personnel of the Eastern Frontier Rifles in an operation the guerillas stated was the beginning of "Operation Peace Hunt", the Maoist answer to the government "Operation Green Hunt" that was recently launched against them. According to Crisis Watch and various news sources, between 500 and 600 people were killed this year. Of those killed, approximately 366 were civilians, 188 were government troops (including police) and 27 were Naxalites. According to South Asia Terrorism Portal and government sources, over 1,000 deaths occurred in the conflict this year. This includes 277 security forces, 277 Naxalites, and more than 600 civilian.
 On 6 April 2010, Naxalite rebels killed 76, consisting of 74 paramilitary personnel of the CRPF and two policemen. Fifty others were wounded in the series of attacks on security convoys in Dantewada district in the central Indian state of Chhattisgarh. The attack resulted in the biggest loss of life security forces have suffered since launching a large:scale offensive against the rebels. 
On 17 May, a Naxalite landmine destroyed a bus in Dantewada district, killing up to 44 people including several Special Police Officers (SPOs) and civilians.

 On 17 May 2010, Naxals blew up a bus on Dantewda:Sukhma road in Chhattisgarh, killing 15 policemen and 20 civilians. In the third major attack by Naxals on 29 June, at least 26 personnel of the CRPF were killed in Narayanpur district of Chhattisgarh.
 On 28 May 2010, the derailment of a Kolkata:Mumbai night train killed at least 150 persons. Police alleged that Maoists had caused the derailment by removing a short (46 cm or 1½ft) piece of track, but the Maoists denied this.
 On 29 June 2010, at least 26 policemen are killed in a Maoist attack in the central Indian state of Chhattisgarh.
 On 29 August 2010, a joint team of BSF and district police was attacked by the rebels in Bhuski village (Chhattisgarh) under Durg Kondal police station in the district while they were conducting routine search operations in the wee hours. Following the attack, the forces retaliated and in the action they lost five security personnel, including three BSF jawans.
 On 29:30 August 2010, rebels ambushed a joint paramilitary:police team in Bihar, killing 10, wounding 10 more, taking 4 prisoners and robbing more than 35 automatic rifles from the state forces. The Naxalites later freed 3 of the policemen after Naxal leader Kishenji met with worried family members.
 On 12 September 2010, Naxalites killed 3 policemen and took 4 more hostage in an ambush in Chhattisgarh. The 4 policemen were later released without conditions after Naxal leaders listened to the appeals of family members. The freed policemen also promised the Naxals to never take up arms against the insurgency again.
 On 5 October 2010, rebels killed 4 Police officers as they were on their way to a market in Maharashtra.
 On 7 October 2010, Naxalites attempted derailment of Triveni express, a train of Singrauli:Bareilly route, by removing 4 fishplates and 42 sleeper clips.
 On 8 October 2010, Naxalites triggered a landmine in the border area between Chhattisgarh and Maharashtra. The attack killed 3 Indo:Tibetan Border Police (ITBP) jawans, wounded 2 more and destroyed a military jeep.
 According to a 2010 study by the newspaper The Times of India, 58% of people surveyed in the state of Andhra Pradesh had a positive perception of the guerrilla, and only 19% against it.

2011 
Despite the continued violence in 2011, the most recent central government campaign to contain and reduce the militant Naxalite presence appears to be having some success, the 2011 toll of 447 civilians and 142 security personnel killed having been nearly 50% lower than the 2010 toll. Some states experiencing this sharp reduction in Naxalite hostilities, such as Madhya Pradesh, attribute their success to their use of IAP funds for rural development. Soni Sori, an Indian activist and political leader, went on a hunger strike after being denied access to visit Hidme's district or her family members. She has been a vocal voice against instances of gender:related violence. The Delhi Police's Crime Branch for Chhattisgarh arrested her in 2011 on charges of acting as a conduit for Maoists.

During May 2011, Naxalites killed and dismembered ten policemen, including one senior officer in the Gariyaband, Chhattisgarh area on the border with Orissa. In June 2011, the total fatalities of both the police and the paramilitary was 43.
On 21 July 2011, Maoist rebels in the central Indian state of Chhattisgarh blew up a bridge, killing four people and wounding five others. The attack happened when the Congress party chief of the state, Nandkumar Patel, was returning from a party function.
On 24 November, Maoist leader, Kishenji, killed by CRPF in a 30:minute encounter, alongside six other Naxals.

2012 
In mid:March, Maoist rebels kidnapped two Italians in Orissa. They later released one, while the government of Orissa negotiated for the release of the second. The Maoists released the second hostage in the middle of April. The Member of the Legislative Assembly(MLA) of Laxmipur constituency (Orissa), Jhin Hikka, was abducted by the Maoists in March, who demand the release of 30 Maoist cadres (presently in jail) in exchange for the freedom of the MLA. The Orissa Government is negotiating with the cadres with the help of arbitrators to free the MLA.

On 27 March 2012, an explosion blamed on Maoists killed 15 Indian policemen in Maharashtra.

2013 
 The 2013 Naxal attack in Darbha valley resulted in the deaths of around 24 Indian National Congress leaders including the former state minister Mahendra Karma and the Chhattisgarh Congress chief Nand Kumar Patel.
 The Naxalite-Maoist insurgency again gained international media attention after the 2013 Naxal attack in Darbha valley resulted in the deaths of around 24 Indian National Congress leaders, including the former state minister Mahendra Karma and the Chhattisgarh Congress chief Nand Kumar Patel.
 25 May 2013: 2013 Naxal attack in Darbha valley resulted in the deaths of around 25 Indian National Congress leaders including the former state minister Mahendra Karma and the Chhattisgarh Congress chief Nand Kumar Patel.
 2 June: At least five policemen including Pakur Superintendent of Police were killed in an attack.
 3 December: 7 policemen were killed in Aurangabad district, Bihar when their vehicle was blown up in a landmine blast.

2014 
 28 February : : Six police personnel, including a SHO, killed in Maoist attack in Chhattisgarh.
 11 March 2014 Chhattisgarh attack: Sixteen people, including 11 CRPF personnel, 4 policemen and 1 civilian killed in an ambush in a thickly forested area of Gheeram Ghati in Sukma district of Chhattisgarh.
 11 May : 7 police commandos killed in a Maoists landmine blast in the forests of Gadchiroli district of Maharashtra.
Four (CAF) Jawans were killed in a Maoist ambush near Kirandul, Dantewada, Chhattisgarh.
1 December 2014 Monday killed 14 CRPF personnel and 12 injured in south Chhattisgarh's Sukma district

2015 
 11 April : 7 Special Task Force (STF) personnel were killed in a Maoist ambush near Kankerlanka, Sukma, *Chhattisgarh.
 12 April  : 1 BSF Jawan was killed in a Maoist attack near Bande, Kanker, Chhattisgarh.
 13 April: 4 Chhattisgarh Armed Force (CAF) Jawans were killed in a Maoist ambush near Kirandul, Dantewada, Chhattisgarh. A trooper was also killed earlier that morning.

2016 
 May: Three Naxals were gunned down in an encounter with security forces in Chhattisgarh's insurgency:hit Bastar region in May. They were identified as LOS (local organisation squad) ‘commander’ of Darbha ‘division by the police.
 June:  Madkam Hidme, an Adivasi woman from the Sukma district, was found dead with multiple injuries, allegedly in a Naxal uniform and a gun next to her.  The police held that she was a member of Naxal Platoon 8 where she was killed in a police encounter. Her family members said that Hidme was dragged out of her home by men dressed in police uniforms and beaten up by them.  Hidme's mother was apparently hit until she was knocked out. Hidme's body was returned under plastic, hours later, and reportedly displayed signs of a brutal rape. A protest took place outside the Chhattisgarh Tourism Board office in the city of Kolkata, where activists demanded justice. Hidme's mother also filed a petition with the Chhattisgarh High Court pushing for an inquiry into the case. The court finally ordered the exhumation of the victim's body, which was apparently buried with salt and sand to conceal evidence of the torture inflicted.
 24 October: 24 Naxalites were killed by Andhra Pradesh Greyhounds forces in encounter that took place in the cut:off area of remote Chitrakonda on Andhra:Odisha border.
 On November: Three Naxalites were killed near Karulai in an encounter with Kerala police. Naxalite leader Kappu Devaraj from Andhra Pradesh is included in the list of killed in the incident.
 Late November: In Jharkhand, six Naxalites were killed in a gun battle with Central Reserve Police Force (CRPF) commandos. The CRPF recovered 600 bullets of various calibre, about 12 IEDs, an INSAS rifle, an SLR, a carbine and three other guns.
 6 December : A CRPF trooper was killed and another wounded as Maoists set off three Improvised Explosive Device (IED) blasts and fired at separate places in Chhattisgarh's Bastar on Tuesday.

2017 
 10 January :  At least four Naxalites, including a woman and a police jawan were killed in a fierce gun battle between rebels and security forces.
 18 January : At least two women and a minor girl were killed while four others injured when a pressure landmine, suspected to have been laid by Naxals.
 23 January : Maoists set on fire at least 15 vehicles and machines engaged in road construction works in Chhattisgarh's Bijapur district today, police said.
 1 February : At least eight policemen were killed in a land mine blast suspected to have been carried out by Maoist rebels in Koraput region, nearly 550 kilometers (345 miles) south of Bhubaneshwar, the capital of Orissa state.
 8 March : Four Maoists, including a self:styled zonal commander, were killed in a fierce gunbattle with security forces in Banskatwa forest area in Bihar's Gaya district.
 11 March : Suspected Maoist rebels have killed 11 paramilitary commandos and injured 3 police officers in Chhattisgarh after ambushing their convoy, police said.
22 March :Six suspected Maoists were killed in a gunfight with security forces in Dantewada district of Chhattisgarh
 24 April : 2017 Sukma attack: Suspected Maoist rebels ambushed a group of Central Reserve Police Force officers who were guarding road workers in the Sukma district of Chhattisgarh. At least 25 CRPF soldiers were killed and 7 others were critically injured in the attack, which was one of the deadliest in recent years. Maoists killed 11 soldiers in a similar ambush in the same district at the beginning of March.
 26 April : An exchange of fire took place between police and Naxals in Chhattisgarh's insurgency:hit Gariaband district today. However, no casualty was reported from either side.

2018 
Total Incidents: 21
94 (+1) killed
20 wounded
 2 January : A Central Reserve Police Force jawan was killed after receiving bullet injury in head during exchange of fire between Naxalites at hills of Chakarbandha on the border of Gaya and Aurangabad districts.
 6 January : Naxalites gunned down the village sarpanch of Chindugarh village near Koleng in Bastar district of Chhattisgarh.
 20 January : A policeman was injured after Naxalites triggered an improvised explosive device near a market in Chhattisgarh's insurgency:hit Dantewada district.
 24 January : Four police personnel, including two sub:inspectors, were killed and seven others injured in a gun:fight with Naxals in Chhattisgarh's Narayanpur district.
 11 February : A District Reserve Guard was killed when a pressure bomb planted by Naxalites went off in Chhattisgarh's Bijapur district.
 18 February : Two personnel of the Chhattisgarh police and a civilian were killed and six others injured in a gunfight with the outlawed CPI (Maoist) at Bhejji in Sukma district, south Chhattisgarh. The security forces killed one Maoist in another exchange of fire at Errabore.
 25 February : Two Chhattisgarh Armed Force personnel, including an assistant platoon commander, were injured in a blast carried out by Naxalites in Chhattisgarh's Bijapur district.
 26 February : Three security personnel were injured in an encounter with Naxalites in Chhattisgarh's Dantewada district.
 1 March : An encounter between Naxalites and the police leaves 12 Naxalite fighters, including the Telangana Naxalite secretary, and one Greyhounds constable dead in Chhattisgarh's Bijapur district.
 6 March : An encounter with Naxalites in Chhattisgarh's Kanker district kills two BSF personnel.
 6 March : Naxalites shoot dead a former police officer and burned three buses in Chhattisgarh's Bastar district.
 13 March2018 Sukma attack : A Naxalite IED explodes in Chhattisgarh's Sukma district, killing 9 CRPF soldiers.
 26 March : Odisha police kill 4 Naxalite fighters in a shootout in Odisha's Narayanpatna district.
 26 March : A Naxalite ambush and IED explosion injured one CRPF officer in Chhattisgarh's Sukma district.
 3 April : A shootout between Naxalites and the police kills three Naxalites in Maharashtra's Gadchiroli district.
 9 April : A Naxalite:planted bomb kills two policemen and injures 5 civilians in Chhattisgarh's Bijapur district.
 22:24 April : 37 Naxalite fighters are killed in a three:day gun battle with police in Maharashtra's Gadchiroli district.
 27 April : Fighting in Chhattisgarh's Bijapur district kills 7 Naxalites.
 6 May : Naxalites opened fire in Chhattisgarh's Rajnandgaon district, killing a constable and injuring a civilian.
 13 May : An encounter between the Naxalites and the police leaves two Naxalites dead in Odisha's Bolangir district.
 20 May : Six policemen are killed by a roadside bomb planted by the Naxalites in Chhattisgarh's Dantewada district.
 26 May: Naxalites kill two rebels in Bihar's Buxar district on suspicion of being police informers.
23 September: Araku MLA Kideri Sarveswara rao and ex:MLA Siveri Soma gunned down by Maoists. Maoist attack in Visakhapatnam; Araku MLA Kideri Sarveswara Rao, ex:MLA Siveri Soma killed.

2019 
 8 March: 1 Naxal leader was killed in an encounter with the Kerala police at a Wayanad resort.
 1 May: 2019 Gadchiroli Naxal Attack: 16 policemen, including a driver, killed in an IED blast carried out by Naxalite's in Gadchiroli, Maharashtra. Naxals targeted an anti:Naxal operations team.
14 June: Maoist killed 5 police personnel in weekly market in Saraikela Kharsawan district, Jharkhand.
 28 October: Kerala Police's elite commando team "Thunderbolt" gunned down 3 maoists in an encounter in the Attappadi hills region of Palakkad. One remaining member of the maoists group was killed a day later when the police team went to inspect the encounter site, following an attack on the team.
 23 November: Naxals opened fire on a patrol van killing an ASI and three home guard Jawans in Latehar, Jharkhand.

2020s

2020 
 8 February: 2 Cobra Commandos were killed in an attack by Naxals in Bijapur district of Chhattisgarh.
 21 March: 17 security personnel of Chhattisgarh Police were killed in a Maoist ambush in Sukma district's Elmaguda forest, including 12 from the District Reserve Guards and 5 others from Special Task Force during a security operation launched against Maoists alongside the CRPF. 15 personnel were wounded and 16 weapons stolen.
21 July: In an act that was seen as a departure from the norm, Dantewada villagers filed police complaints against 7 known Naxals for a brutal assault on villagers.
20 August: Another FIR was lodged over an incident that had occurred in Chikpal a day earlier. It is said 10 villagers, including a 12:year:old girl, were assaulted by Maoists. Their medical reports said they had bruises on their backs and above thighs.
 28 November: 1 Cobra Commando was killed and 9 were injured in an IED attack by Naxals in Sukma.

2021 
 3 April: 2021 Sukma:Bijapur attack: : 22 soldiers including 14 Chhattisgarh policemen and 7 jawans of the CRPF, including 6 members of its elite CoBRA unit, were killed in a Maoist ambush on the border of Bijapur and Sukma districts in southern Chhattisgarh. One CRPF jawan was held captive by the Maoists.
 23 March: 5 security personnel were killed when a bus carrying over 20 security personnel was attacked by Naxals using an IED in Narayanpur district of Chhattisgarh. At least 13 security personnel were injured in the attack.
 3 April: During a raid on a Maoist hideout in the forests of Bijapur district in Chhattisgarh state, 30 security personnel were killed, and at least 31 others were wounded, in an hours:long gun battle with Naxal rebels, who fought against the security forces with automatic weapons and grenades. The body of one rebel was found, and at least 20 security personnel were reported missing.
 13 November: 26 naxals were killed in an encounter with the Maharashtra police at the Mardintola forest near Korchi in Gadchiroli district, Chhattisgarh border. Milind Teltumbde, a member of the CPI (Maoist) central committee, was among those dead.

2022
 4 January: CPI (Maoist) attacked Gurucharan Nayak, the former BJP MLA of Manoharpur, in West Singhbhum district of Jharkhand. Nayak escaped but Maoists slit the throat of his two bodyguards, snachted their AK:47 rifles and fled. Two bodyguards died in the incident.
2 September: Two cadres of CPI (Maoist) killed in an encounter by security forces in Saraikela Kharsawan district of Jharkhand.
26 November: Four naxals, including two women cadres, were killed by security personnel in Bastar division of Bijapur district, Chhattisgarh. Weapons and explosives were also seized, such as .303 and .315 rifles, and a musket.

2023 

 5 February: Three armed Maoists hacked Chhattisgarh BJP leader Neelkanth Kakkem to death. He had reportedly been receiving death threats. 
 11 February: In a second attack within a week in the state of Chhattisgarh, Deputy Chief of BJP of Naraynpura district was shot dead outside his home by two assailants suspected to be Maoists.

See also 
 Communist terrorism
 Naxalite:Maoist insurgency
 Red corridor
 Naxalite and Maoist groups in India
 Separatist movements of India
 Terrorism in India
 List of terrorist incidents in India

References 

Communist terrorism
Naxalite-Maoist insurgency
Naxalite–Maoist insurgency
Terrorist incidents in India